Ram Lal Rahi (1 January 1934 – 10 December 2020) was a leader of Indian National Congress and a former Minister in the Union Government 1991-1996. He was the Minister of State for Home Affairs during the Narasimha Rao government and was a four- time MP from Mishrikh and a two time MLA from Hargaon in Sitapur district.

Personal life 
Born on 1 January 1934 into Pasi caste to Shri Dhodey at Vill. Dhakhara in Sitapur (Uttar Pradesh). He completed his high school from Raja Raghubar Dayal Inter College, Sitapur (Uttar Pradesh).

Politics 
He became Minister of State for Home Affairs during the Narasimha Rao government and was a four-time MP from Mishrikh and a two time MLA from Hargaon in Sitapur district. He left his party and unofficially joined Bharatiya Janata Party before Uttar Pradesh Assembly Election 2017 and later re-joined Congress in 2019.
 
His son Suresh Rahi is an MLA of Hargaon from BJP.

Death 
Ramlal Rahi was admitted to the district hospital in Sitapur after complaining of chest pain and breathing difficulty. He died around 5:30 pm on 10 December 2020, of a heart attack and also testing positive for COVID-19 during the COVID-19 pandemic in India. He was 86 years old.

References

1934 births
2020 deaths
Lok Sabha members from Uttar Pradesh
People from Sitapur district
Union ministers of state of India
Indian National Congress politicians
India MPs 1977–1979
India MPs 1980–1984
India MPs 1989–1991
India MPs 1991–1996
Deaths from the COVID-19 pandemic in India